Fox Sports International (FSI) is an international sportscasting and production division of The Walt Disney Company. The division shares its name with both the United States-based sports division of Fox Corporation, and the chain of regional sports networks that have since been disaffiliated with Fox following their acquisition by Disney.

FSI cooperated with CanWest, the owner of Fox Sports World Canada, until its sale to Shaw Communications in 2010.

List of channels

Current channels

 Fox Sports 1 (Chile)
 Fox Sports 2 (Latin America)
 Fox Sports 3 (Latin America)
 Fox Sports 2 (Brazil)

Former channels
 Fox Sports Middle East
 Fox Sports World Canada (Canada; joint venture with CanWest)
 Fox Sports Italy
 Fox Sports Africa (replaced by ESPN Africa)
 Fox Sports Netherlands (replaced by ESPN Netherlands)
Fox Sports Eredivisie (51%)
 FSI Netherlands (51%)
 Fox Sports (Cyprus, Greece, Malta and Turkey) 
 Fox Sports Israel
 JTBC3 Fox Sports (South Korea; joint venture with JTBC) (replaced by JTBC Golf&Sports)
 Fox Sports & Entertainment (Japan)
Fox Sports Asia
 Fox Sports Latin America (replaced by ESPN4)
 Fox Sports Argentina
 Fox Sports Premium (replaced by ESPN Premium)
 Fox Sports Mexico
 Fox Sports Brazil (replaced by ESPN4)

References 

 
Fox Sports
Disney television networks